Jacelyn Tay Siew Cheng (born 12 June 1975) is a Singaporean former actress, health coach and businesswoman . She was crowned the female champion of the local Star Search Singapore competition in 1995 and left as a full-time Mediacorp artiste on 2006.

In 2004 and 2005 respectively, Tay published the books Feel Good Look Good with Jacelyn and Make-up for Asian Women. She further pursued a career in the wellness industry in 2006 by setting up Body Inc. Holistic Wellness Centre. She is currently a health coach, nutrition consultant and a registered BFR practitioner.

Personal life
When she was 25, Tay declared bankruptcy after owing $300,000 to a stockbroking company. She was discharged from bankruptcy four years later in 2004.

On 10 October 2010, Tay married Brian Wong, her business partner and boyfriend of two years. On 6 July 2011, Tay gave birth to a boy, Zavier Wong. On 18 November 2018, Tay announced that they were finalising their divorce proceedings.

Filmography

Television series
1995	
Tales of the Third Kind 第三类剧场
1996
Tofu Street 豆腐街 (Bai Shui Xian)
Triad Justice 飞跃珍珠坊
My Destiny With You 缘来是你
Tales of the city II 都市奇情II
Telemovie: Spirit On Wheels 电视电影:鬼德士
Telemovie: Life on the Run 魂断四面佛
Living By Night 都是夜归人 (Fan Zi Yun)
1997
The Choice Partner 错爱今生
The Guest People 客家之歌
Dreams 七个梦
1998
Legend of the Eight Immortals 东游记 (He Xiangu)
1999 		
Are You My Brother? 错体双宝
Coupe De Scorpion 天蝎行动
2000
The Legendary Swordsman 笑傲江湖 (Dongfang Bubai)
The Voices Within 心灵物语 (Janice)
2001
Love Me, Love Me Not 真爱无敌
The Hotel 大酒店 (Rainbow)
Master Swordsman Lu Xiaofeng 陸小鳳之決戰前後
2002
The Wing of Desire 天使的诱惑
The Money Game 金钱本色
2003
Romance De Amour 一加一等于三
Love Is Beautiful 美丽家庭
2004
The Ties That Bind 家财万贯
You Are The One 二分之一缘分 (Telecast in February 2005)
2005
Beyond the Axis of Truth II 法医X档案II 
Love Concierge 爱的掌门人 (Louise Jiang Ru Yi) 
2012
Pillow Talk 再见单人床 (Alice)
Game Plan 千方百计 (Mo Yan)
2015
Crescendo 起飞 (Irene Lin Meiling)

Film 
2003
After School 放学后 (Lin Yi Fang)
2011
Homecoming (笑着回家）

Variety show 
2009
CelebriTEA Break II (Guest)
2013
Three Dish One Soup 三菜一汤 (Guest)

Bibliography
Makeup For Asian Women (Times Editions – Marshall Cavendish, 10 June 2005) 
Feel Good, Look Good with Jacelyn (Lee Mei Lin, editor, Times Editions, Singapore, 1 July 2004)

Awards and nominations

References

External links
Official website

Singaporean television personalities
Singaporean television actresses
Singaporean film actresses
20th-century Singaporean actresses
21st-century Singaporean actresses
1975 births
Living people
Cedar Girls' Secondary School alumni
Singaporean people of Teochew descent
Catholic Junior College alumni
National University of Singapore alumni